Formica picea is a species of ant belonging to the family Formicidae.

References

picea
Insects described in 1846